Apertochrysa sierra is a species of green lacewing in the family Chrysopidae. It is found in the western United States and Baja California, Mexico.

References

Chrysopidae
Articles created by Qbugbot
Insects described in 1924